1701 is the natural number preceding 1702 and following 1700.

In mathematics
1701 is an odd number and a Stirling number of the second kind.

The number 1701 also has unusual properties as it:
 belongs to a set of numbers such that  contains exactly seven different digits.
 is a decagonal and a 13-gonal number.
 is divisible by the square of the sum of its digits.
 belongs to a set of numbers with only palindromic prime factors whose sum is palindromic.
 is a First Beale cipher.
 belongs to a set of numbers whose digits of prime factors are either 3 or 7.
 its reversal digit sequence (1071) is divisible by 7.
 is a Harshad number.

In Star Trek
In the Star Trek science fiction franchise, NCC-1701 is the designation for several starships named USS Enterprise. Several of these vessels are focal points in the fictional universe created by Gene Roddenberry.

References

Integers